Santa Ysabel may refer to the following:

Santa Ysabel, California, USA
Santa Ysabel Asistencia, a mission east of San Diego, California
Santa Ysabel Island in the South Pacific